"Life Is Sweet" is a song by the English big beat duo The Chemical Brothers, released as the second and final single from their first album, Exit Planet Dust. It features Tim Burgess from The Charlatans on vocals. It reached number 25 on the UK Singles Chart.

Music video 
The music video for the song shows The Chemical Brothers playing the song and controlling four people: a couple and two "children". In the video, The Chemical Brothers realise that some of their equipment is breaking and Tom Rowlands tries to fix it while singer Tim Burgess watches them through a hole in the wall.

Track listing 
The remixes of the song notably contain very little of the original track. Daft Punk's remix was reportedly only the duo's third released recording. "If I Kling to Me I'll Klong to You" originally appeared on the 12-inch only My Mercury Mouth E.P (1994).

UK CD No. 1
 "Life Is Sweet" (album version) – 6:34
 "Life Is Sweet" (remix two) – 6:16
 "Life Is Sweet" (Daft Punk remix) – 8:39
 "Leave Home" (Terror Drums) – 3:46

UK CD No. 2
 "Life Is Sweet" (remix one) – 7:05
 "If You Kling to Me I'll Klong to You" – 5:24
 "Chico's Groove" (mix two) – 4:03

12-inch single
 "Life Is Sweet"
 "Life Is Sweet" (Daft Punk remix)
 "Life Is Sweet" (remix one)
 "Life Is Sweet" (remix two)

Charts

References

1995 singles
1995 songs
The Chemical Brothers songs
Virgin Records singles
Astralwerks singles
Songs written by Tom Rowlands
Songs written by Ed Simons
Music videos directed by Walter Stern